Bibbi Gunilla Segerström (12 June 1943 – 31 October 2014) was a Swedish swimmer. She competed at the 1960 Summer Olympics in the 400 m freestyle and 4 × 100 m freestyle relay and finished eighth and sixth, respectively. After marriage, she changed her last name to Dobkousky.

References

1943 births
2014 deaths
Swimmers at the 1960 Summer Olympics
Swedish female freestyle swimmers
Olympic swimmers of Sweden
SK Neptun swimmers
Sportspeople from Linköping
Sportspeople from Östergötland County
20th-century Swedish women